This Is Family is an American reality television series that premiered on Prime Video on September 28, 2018, and moved to Facebook Watch beginning with the fourth season in 2021. The show focuses on the personal and professional lives of the prominent Lebanese American Nossiff-Azarian family through their day-to-day life in Boston. The fourth season premiered on January 29, 2021.

Cast

Timeline of cast members

Production 
This Is Family is produced by Boston-based production company Next Studios. The series is executive produced by cast members Joseph Azarian, Naseem Nossiff, David Azarian, and Sandra Richa, as well as Annmarie Richa as a co-executive producer. The series was greenlit on April 27, 2018, and premiered on September 28, 2018 on Prime Video. A second season premiered on March 15, 2019 on Prime Video. On April 14, 2019, cast member Joseph Azarian announced on Twitter that the show would return for a third season on September 27, 2019.

On September 7, 2019, ahead of the season three premiere, the series was renewed for a fourth season.

On September 15, 2019, Next Studios announced on Twitter that This Is Family would be a launch customer for the Sony PXW-FX9 cinema camera.

Episodes

Season 1 (2018)

Season 2 (2019)

Season 3 (2019-2020)

Season 4 (2021) 
This is the last season of the series available exclusively on Prime Video.

Soundtrack 

This Is Family's original EDM soundtrack is produced mainly by composer Samuel PK Smith. According to the BMI repertoire, Smith has composed for television in the past: namely E!'s Keeping Up with the Kardashians. The rest of the soundtrack is produced by hip-hop producer Daniel John and electronic producer/DJ Tim Gunter. The soundtrack has notably been described in reviews as "impressive" and "superb."

Library music is sourced mainly from the boutique Los Angeles-based music library, Lab Hits; as well as InStyle Music, Spacebrother Music Library, and Beat Bosses Music Group.

The series features several artists’ music, including Swedish house composer Tobu, Kaerhart, Tyzo Bloom, Canopy Climbers, and Bird Passengers.

The main title music for the first three seasons of This Is Family was composed for the series by composer Nate Dodge, who also composed the main title for Dash Dolls and is currently the series composer for Total Divas and Total Bellas. Season four's main title music was produced by Daniel John, and is the instrumental version of his song, "Better Me."

Reception 
The series was met with generally positive reviews from critics. The show maintains approximately a four star rating on Prime Video.

References 

2010s American reality television series
English-language television shows
2018 American television series debuts